Thomas Kynnyllyn (1487/88–1544/58), of Monmouth, was a Welsh politician.

He was a Member (MP) of the Parliament of England for Monmouth Boroughs in 1542.

References

1488 births
1540s deaths
16th-century Welsh people
People of the Tudor period
People from Monmouth
Members of the Parliament of England (pre-1707)